Bhognipur Assembly constituency is a part of the Kanpur Dehat district of Uttar Pradesh and it comes under Jalaun Lok Sabha constituency.

Members of Legislative Assembly
1957: Ram Swaroop, Independent
1962: Raj Narain Misra, Indian National Congress
1967: Keshari Lal, Samyukta Socialist Party
1969: Jwala Prasad Kureel, Indian National Congress
1974: Keshari Lal, Bharatiya Kranti Dal
1977: Mauji Lal Kureel, Janata Party
1980: Ganga Sagar Sankhwar, Indian National Congress (Indira)
1985: Radhey Shyam, Indian National Congress
1989: Pyare Lal Sankhwar, Janata Dal
1991: Pyare Lal Sankhwar, Janata Dal
1993: Bhagwati Prasad Sagar, Bahujan Samaj Party
1996: Radhey Shyam Kori, Bahujan Samaj Party
2002: Arun Kumari Kori, Samajwadi Party
2007: Raghunath Prasad Sankhwar, Bahujan Samaj Party
2012: Yogendra Pal Singh, Samajwadi Party
2017: Vinod Kumar Katiyar, Bharatiya Janata Party
2022: Rakesh Sachan, Bharatiya Janata Party

Election results

2022

2017

References

External links
 

Assembly constituencies of Uttar Pradesh
Kanpur Dehat district